is a Japanese pharmaceutical company best known for developing Crestor. Medical supply and brand name also uses katakana (シオノギ).

Shionogi has business roots that date back to 1878, and was incorporated in 1919. Among the medicines produced are for hyperlipidaemia, antibiotics, and cancer medicines.

In Japan it is particularly known as a producer of antimicrobial and antibiotics.  Because of antibiotic resistance and slow growth of the antibiotic market, it has teamed up with US based Schering-Plough (merged in 2009 with Merck & Co) to become a sole marketing agent for its products in Japan.

Shionogi had supported the initial formation of Ranbaxy Pharmaceuticals, a generic manufacturer based in India. In 2012 the company became a partial owner of ViiV Healthcare, a pharmaceutical company specialising in the development of therapies for HIV.

The company is listed on the Tokyo Stock Exchange and Osaka Securities Exchange and is constituent of the Nikkei 225 stock index.

Medicines

Released
 Avelox, antibacterial antiseptic that treats a number of infections.
 Claritin, An anti-histamine marketed in alliance with Schering-Plough.
 Crestor, cholesterol drug , marketing rights sold to AstraZeneca in 1998.
 Cymbalta, an SNRI class anti-depressant, marketed in alliance with Eli Lilly.
 Differin (developed by Galderma), a topical retinoid for acne, marketed in Japan in alliance with Galderma.
 Fortamet
 Methylin
 Mogadon, a short-term treatment for insomnia.
 Mulpleta, a thrombopoietin receptor agonist.
 Osphena, an estrogen receptor agonist, marketing rights sold to Duchesnay in 2017.
 Symproic, a μ-opioid receptor antagonist, for opioid-induced constipation treatment.
 Xofluza, an endonuclease inhibitor, for influenza treatment.
 Ensitrelvir (S-217622), the first Japanese domestic pill to treat COVID-19, yet to be approved in Japan; as of September 2022.

Under development
  (BGE-175), a DP1 receptor antagonist under development for treament of COVID-19 in elderly patients and allergic rhinitis.

Media
 Shionogi has a close relationship with Fuji Television Network, Inc., because Shionogi is the sponsor of "Music Fair" (as of January 2010, aired on 17 TV stations including TV Oita System Co.) started in 1964.
 Shionogi was a main sponsor of Team Lotus in the team's final years between 1991 and 1994.

References

External links

 Official Website 
 Official U.S. Website 

Biotechnology companies of Japan
Companies listed on the Osaka Exchange
Companies listed on the Tokyo Stock Exchange
Japanese brands
Manufacturing companies based in Osaka
Pharmaceutical companies established in 1878
Pharmaceutical companies of Japan
COVID-19 vaccine producers